Banwra is 1950 Bollywood film directed by G. Rakesh, pseudonym of Raghupat Roy Kapur, grandfather of actor Aditya Roy Kapoor. It stars Raj Kapoor, Nimmi in lead roles.

Cast
Raj Kapoor
Nimmi
K. N. Singh
Lalita Pawar
Ratan Kumar

Music

References

External links
 
 Banwra Songs Lyrics at HINDI SONGS LYRICS

1950 films
1950s Hindi-language films
Indian drama films
1950 drama films
Indian black-and-white films